Aranimermis is a genus of nematodes belonging to the family Mermithidae.

Species:

Aranimermis aptispicula 
Aranimermis giganteus

References

Nematodes